is a Japanese actor, entertainer and model. He is best known for his roles as Sadaharu Inui of the fourth generation Seigaku cast in The Prince of Tennis musical series, Tenimyu, and Shijo Haruki in Hanazakari no Kimitachi e series. He was a Super Junon contestant and winner in 2006. He is represented by MerryGoRound Inc.

Filmography

Movies 
Classmates (2008) as Naoki Murai
Taiikukan Baby (2008) as Naoki Murai
Takumi-kun Series 2: Niji Irō no Garasu (2009) as Takeshi Suzuki
Tsuki to Uso to Satsujin (2010) as Taniguchi
Junjō (2010) as Shōsei Kurata

Television 
Hanazakari no Kimitachi e (2007, Fuji TV) as Haruki Shijō
Dansei Fushin no Otome (2008, TV Asahi) 
Cafe Kichijoji de (2008, TV Tokyo) 
Hanazakari no Kimitachi e 2 (2008, Fuji TV) as Haruki Shijō
Shugoshin Bodyguard Shindō Teru (2013, TBS), episode 3
Suiri sakka Ike Kayoko (2013, Fuji TV)

Stage 
TENIMYU: THE PRINCE OF TENNIS MUSICAL SERIES (as Sadaharu Inui)
 The Prince of Tennis Musical: The Progressive Match Higa Chuu feat. Rikkai (In Winter 2007-2008)
 The Prince of Tennis Musical: Dream Live 5th (2008)
The Prince of Tennis Musical: The Imperial Presence Hyotei Gakuen feat. Higa Chuu (2008) 
The Prince of Tennis Musical: The Treasure Match Shitenhouji feat. Hyotei Gakuen (2008-2009)
The Prince of Tennis Musical: Dream Live 6th (2009)

References

External links 
 
Official HanaKimi website

1984 births
Living people
Japanese male actors